Bräcke Municipality is a municipality in Jämtland County in northern Sweden. Its seat is located in Bräcke.

The present municipality was formed in 1974 when "old" Bräcke Municipality was amalgamated with Kälarne and Revsund. The three former municipalities had been created in 1952. The number of original entities (as of 1863) were six. Due to the declining population in the area further amalgamations have been proposed, but rejected.

Localities

There are four localities (or urban areas) in Bräcke Municipality:

The municipal seat in bold

Villages
Albacken
Bensjö
Fanbyn
Gimdalen
Hunge
Nyhem
Rissna
Stavre
Sundsjö
Sörbygden
Västanede

Notable people
One of the most famous people coming from Bräcke Municipality is the former middle distance runner and world record holder Gunder Hägg, who was born in the village Albacken outside of the town Bräcke.

References

External links

Bräcke Municipality - Official site

Municipalities of Jämtland County